Zach Payne (born February 24, 1989) is an American politician and businessman who has served in the Indiana House of Representatives from the 66th district since 2020. Payne previously served as a member of the Jeffersonville, Indiana City Council and as the Clark County, Indiana County Recorder.

Elections
2011 Primary election - Payne was unopposed in the Republican Primary for Jeffersonville City Council - District 3.
2011 General Election - At 22 years old, Payne was elected with 42.6% of the vote to serve on the Jeffersonville City Council against Independent Eric Hedrick (30.7%) and Democrat Janice Sinkhorn (26.7%).
2014 Primary Election - Payne was unopposed in the Republican Primary for Clark County Recorder.
2014 General Election - Payne was elected to be the Clark County Recorder with 53.58% of the vote against Democrat Lincoln Crum's 46.42%.

References

1989 births
Living people
Republican Party members of the Indiana House of Representatives
21st-century American politicians
People from Charlestown, Indiana
People from Louisville, Kentucky